The Catalan Red Liberation Army (ERCA)  was a militant group seeking greater autonomy for the Catalan region of Spain.

Activities 
 1987, 27 March:  Claimed responsibility for a car bombing in Barcelona which killed a Spanish civil guard and injured 15.
1987, December:  Claimed responsibility for a grenade attack on the Bar Iruna, a USO club in Barcelona, which killed an American sailor.  The attack was also claimed by Terra Lliure.

References 

Politics of Catalonia
Secessionist organizations in Europe
Catalan nationalism
Left-wing militant groups in Spain